In enzymology, a thiocyanate isomerase is an enzyme that catalyzes the chemical reaction

benzyl isothiocyanate  benzyl thiocyanate

Hence, this enzyme has one substrate, benzyl isothiocyanate, and one product, benzyl thiocyanate.

This enzyme belongs to the family of isomerases, specifically those other isomerases sole sub-subclass for isomerases that do not belong in the other subclasses.  The systematic name of this enzyme class is benzyl-thiocyanate isomerase. This enzyme is also called isothiocyanate isomerase.

References 

 

EC 5.99.1
Enzymes of unknown structure